Death receptor 6 (DR6), also known as tumor necrosis factor receptor superfamily member 21 (TNFRSF21), is a cell surface receptor of the tumor necrosis factor receptor superfamily which activates the JNK and NF-κB pathways. It is mostly expressed in the thymus, spleen and white blood cells. The Gene for DR6 is 78,450 bases long and is found on the 6th chromosome. This is transcribed into a 655 amino acid chain weighing 71.8 kDa. Post transcriptional modifications of this protein include glycosylation on the asparagines at the 82, 141, 252, 257, 278, and 289 amino acid locations.

Function 

The protein encoded by this gene is a member of the TNF-receptor superfamily. This receptor has been shown to activate NF-κB and MAPK8/JNK, and induce cell apoptosis. Through its death domain, this receptor interacts with TRADD protein, which is known to serve as an adaptor that mediates signal transduction of TNF-receptors. Knockout studies in mice suggested that this gene plays a role in T helper cell activation, and may be involved in inflammation and immune regulation. The DR6 is an alpha-helical integral membrane receptor protein that shows evidence that it has something to do with the inhibition of blood vessels forming on tumors which would allow them to grow larger. Death receptor 6 gets a chemical message and starts a signaling pathway that causes apoptosis, also known as cell death, to occur. It is also expressed in endothelial cells. Tumor cells can induce, through exposition of amyloid precursor protein (APP), DR6-mediated endothelial cell necroptosis allowing tumors metastasis.

Clinical significance 

The free serum levels of this DR6 are heightened with anti-cell death factors in patients that have later stage ovarian cancer.

DR6 is also thought to be involved in neurodegeneration in the brain that causes Alzheimer's disease as well as signal transduction in stress response and cellular survival. DR6 induces apoptosis when it is over expressed, however the manner in which the death signal is intracellularly transduced is currently unknown. It has been determined that Bax translocation is necessary for the apoptosis triggered by DR6, but through an unknown pathway instead of the traditional pathways of intrinsic versus extrinsic.  APP (amyloid precursor protein) is the natural ligand of DR6 and is first cleaved into Aβ and N-APP. N-APP is the fragment that interacts with DR6 to trigger axonal degradation in Alzheimer's patients.   This pathway is essentially "hi-jacked" in the aging brain.

References

Further reading 

 
 
 
 
 
 

TNF receptor family